Karashamb (also Romanized as K’arashamb and Qarashamb) is a village in the Kotayk Province of Armenia.

Karashamb is the site of a major archaeological excavation of a Bronze Age cemetery with a number of barrows. The richest was a "royal" sepulchre where a silver cup, now one of the treasures of the National Museum, was discovered.

See also 
Kotayk Province

References

Sources

Populated places in Kotayk Province